Play It Like It Is is an album by the progressive bluegrass band Country Gentlemen, recorded in 1969. This album was the last for mandolinist John Duffey, founding member of the band.

Track listing

 He Was A Friend Of Mine
 Daybreak In Dixie
 Some Old Days
 Raggy Mountain Shakedown
 Banana Boat Song
 Going To The Races
 Waiting For The Boys
 Darling Little Joe
 El Dedo
 Mary Dear
 Blue Ridge Mountain Home
 Take Me In A Life Boat

Personnel
 Charlie Waller - guitar, vocals
 John Duffey - mandolin, vocals
 Eddie Adcock - banjo, vocals
 Ed Ferris - bass, vocals

References

1969 albums
Rebel Records albums
The Country Gentlemen albums